Volle Kraft voraus! is the second album by the German band Die Krupps.

Track listing
 "Volle Kraft voraus" – 3:44
 "Goldfinger" – 3:21
 "Für einen Augenblick" – 4:14
 "Tod und Teufel" – 2:45
 "Das Ende der Träume" – 3:34
 "Neue Helden" – 3:08
 "Wahre Arbeit, wahrer Lohn" – 5:24
 "...Denn du lebst nur einmal" – 3:28
 "Zwei Herzen, ein Rhythmus" – 3:33
 "Lärm macht Spaß" – 3:44
 "Wahre Arbeit, wahrer Lohn" – 3:41 (1993 bonus track)
 "True Work - True Pay" – 6:23 (1993 bonus track)

Credits
 Jürgen Engler - vocals, keyboards, computer drums, effects
 Bernward Malaka - bass guitar
 Tina Schnekenburger - keyboards, effects
 Ralf Dörper - keyboards

1982 albums
Die Krupps albums